Randy Allen (born 1950) is an American football coach.  He is the current head coach at Highland Park High School in Dallas, Texas.  With a total record of 424-92-6 (as of 12/1/2021) Allen is the #1 winningest active high school football coach in Texas.

Playing Career
A native of Abilene, Texas, Allen prepped at 5A Cooper High School, a football powerhouse. With Allen at tailback and slotback, Abilene Cooper made it to the 1967 state final against Austin Reagan at Fort Worth's Amon G. Carter Stadium, but lost 20-19 in a controversial last-second decision. Upon graduation in 1968, Allen went on to play at Southern Methodist University in Dallas for coach Hayden Fry.

Coaching Career
Allen's first coaching was at Bryan High School as an assistant under his former high school football coach, Merrill Green.Eight years later, Allen landed his first head coaching job at Ballinger High School. Ballinger had not had a winning season in five years prior to Allen's arrival. The Bearcats compiled a 44–15–2 record under Allen the following five years.

In 1986, Allen was selected to succeed Gordon Wood at Brownwood High School. Facing enormous expectations, Allen managed to compile a 43–13–2 record in five seasons. In 1991, he chose to return to his alma mater Abilene Cooper, which had gone 1–9 in 1990. In 1996, Allen guided the Cougars to their first state final appearance since 1967——a game in which Allen played in. Abilene Cooper lost to Austin Westlake, which was led by quarterback Drew Brees, 55-15.

Leaving Abilene in 1999, Allen became head coach at Highland Park High School in Dallas. With Allen as head coach, Highland Park had 10+ win seasons every year, except in 2004 when they finished 8-2. In 2005, Highland Park went undefeated for the first time in school history. They won the 4A state title for the first time in 48 years. Led by quarterback Matthew Stafford, the Scots defeated Marshall 59-0.

On October 14, 2011, Allen became the 10th man in Texas high school football history to coach his teams to 300 wins with Highland Park's 41-27 win over JJ Pearce High School.

Highland Park became the first Texas high school football team to win 800 games with a 31-24 victory over Denton Ryan in the Texas State Semi-Finals on December 10, 2016.

In 2016, Allen led the Scots to their second state title during his tenure, winning the AAAAA Division I Championship 16-7 against Temple High School.  Allen was named the Don Shula National Coach of the Year for 2016.

In 2017, Allen led Highland Park to its fifth state championship and the third during his tenure, in a win against Manvel High School, 53-49.  He announced his retirement in the spring of 2018 thereafter. He rescinded his retirement only three weeks later. The following year, Allen led Highland Park to its sixth state championship and fourth title during his tenure. Highland Park Shadow Creek High School 27-17 in the AAAAA Division I State Championship.

On September 9, 2022, Allen became the winningest coach in Texas high school football history with win number 427 over Lake Highlands 52-21.

Personal life
In January 2014, Allen was chosen as the recipient of the 2013 Grant Teaff Fellowship of Christian Athletes Lifetime Achievement Award.

In 2017, Randy Allen was selected as an SMU Distinguished Alumnus.

References 

1950 births
Living people
Sportspeople from Abilene, Texas
Players of American football from Texas
American football running backs
SMU Mustangs football players
Coaches of American football from Texas
High school football coaches in Texas